William Selman was an English politician who was MP for Plympton Erle in January 1397. History of Parliament Online suggests that he was a brother of John Selman.

References

English MPs January 1397
Members of the Parliament of England for Plympton Erle
14th-century births